"Baby, Please Don't Go" is a traditional  blues song that was popularized by Delta blues musician Big Joe Williams in 1935.   Many cover versions followed, leading to its description as "one of the most played, arranged, and rearranged pieces in blues history" by French music historian Gérard Herzhaft.

After World War II, Chicago blues and rhythm and blues artists adapted the song to newer music styles. In 1952, a doo-wop version by the Orioles reached the top ten on the R&B chart. In 1953, Muddy Waters recorded the song as an electric Chicago-ensemble blues piece, which influenced many subsequent renditions.  By the early 1950s, the song became a blues standard.

In the 1960s, "Baby, Please Don't Go" became a popular rock song after the Northern Irish group Them recorded it in 1964. Jimmy Page, a studio guitarist at the time, participated in the recording session, possibly on rhythm guitar. Subsequently, Them's uptempo rock arrangement also made it a rock standard. AC/DC and Aerosmith are among the rock groups who have recorded the song.  "Baby, Please Don't Go" has been inducted into both the Blues and Rock and Roll Halls of Fame.

Background
"Baby, Please Don't Go" is likely an adaptation of "Long John", an old folk theme which dates back to the time of slavery in the United States. Blues researcher Paul Garon notes that the melody is based on "Alabamy Bound", composed by Tin Pan Alley writer Ray Henderson, with lyrics by Buddy DeSylva and Bud Green in 1925. The song, a vaudeville show tune, inspired several other songs between 1925 and 1935, such as "Elder Greene Blues", "Alabama Bound", and "Don't You Leave Me Here".  These variants were recorded by Charlie Patton, Lead Belly, Monette Moore, Henry Thomas, and Tampa Red.

Author Linda Dahl suggests a connection to a song with the same title by Mary Williams Johnson in the late 1920s and early 1930s. However, Johnson, who was married to jazz-influenced blues guitarist Lonnie Johnson, never recorded it and her song is not discussed as influencing later performers. Blues researcher Jim O'Neal notes that Williams "sometimes said that the song was written by his wife, singer Bessie Mae Smith ( Blue Belle and St. Louis Bessie)."

Original song
Big Joe Williams used the imprisonment theme for his October 31, 1935, recording of "Baby, Please Don't Go".  He recorded it during his first session for Lester Melrose and Bluebird Records in Chicago. It is an ensemble piece with Williams on vocal and guitar accompanied by Dad Tracy on one-string fiddle and Chasey "Kokomo" Collins on washboard, who are listed as "Joe Williams' Washboard Blues Singers" on the single.  Musical notation for the song indicates a moderate-tempo fifteen-bar blues in 4/4 or common time in the key of B flat. As with many Delta blues songs of the era, it remains on the tonic chord (I) throughout without the progression to the subdominant (IV) or dominant (V) chords. The lyrics express a prisoner's anxiety about his lover leaving before he returns home:

The song became a hit and established Williams' recording career. On December 12, 1941, he recorded a second version titled "Please Don't Go" in Chicago for Bluebird, with a more modern arrangement and lyrics. Blues historian Gerard Herzhaft calls it "the most exciting version", which Williams recorded using his trademark nine-string guitar. Accompanying him are Sonny Boy Williamson I on harmonica and Alfred Elkins on imitation bass (possibly a washtub bass). Since both songs appeared before recording industry publications began tracking such releases, it is unknown which version was more popular. In 1947, he recorded it for Columbia Records with Williamson and Ransom Knowling on bass and Judge Riley on drums. This version did not reach the Billboard Race Records chart, but represents a move toward a more urban blues treatment of the song.

Later blues and R&B recordings
Big Joe Williams' various recordings inspired other blues musicians to record their interpretations of the song and it became a blues standard. Early examples include Papa Charlie McCoy as "Tampa Kid" (1936), Leonard "Baby Doo" Caston (1939), Lightnin' Hopkins (1947), John Lee Hooker (1949), and Big Bill Broonzy (1952). By the early 1950s, the song was reworked in contemporary musical styles, with an early rhythm and blues/jump blues version by Billy Wright (1951), a harmonized doo-wop version by the Orioles (a number eight R&B hit in 1952), and an Afro-Cuban-influenced rendition by Rose Mitchell (1954).  Mose Allison recorded the tune in his jazz-blues piano style for the album Transfiguration of Hiram Brown (1960).

In 1953, Muddy Waters recast the song as a Chicago-blues ensemble piece with Little Walter and Jimmy Rogers.  Chess Records originally issued the single with the title "Turn the Lamp Down Low", although the song is also referred to as "Turn Your Lamp Down Low", "Turn Your Light Down Low", or "Baby Please Don't Go".  He regularly played the song, several performances were recorded. Live versions appear on Muddy Waters at Newport 1960 and on Live at the Checkerboard Lounge, Chicago 1981 with members of the Rolling Stones. AllMusic critic Bill Janovitz cites the influence of Waters' adaptation:

Van Morrison and Them rendition

"Baby Please Don't Go" was one of the earliest songs recorded by Them, fronted by a 19-year-old Van Morrison. Their rendition of the song was derived from a version recorded by John Lee Hooker in 1949 as "Don't Go Baby". Hooker's song later appeared on a 1959 album, Highway of Blues, which Van Morrison heard and felt was "something really unique and different" with "more soul" than he had previously heard.

Recording and composition
Them recorded "Baby, Please Don't Go" for Decca Records in October 1964. Besides Morrison, there is conflicting information about who participated in the session. In addition to the group's original members (guitarist Billy Harrison, bassist Alan Henderson, drummer Ronnie Millings and keyboard player Eric Wrixon), others have been suggested: Pat McAuley on keyboards, Bobby Graham on a second drum kit, Jimmy Page on guitar, and Peter Bardens on keyboards. As Page biographer George Case notes, "There is a dispute over whether it is Page's piercing blues line that defines the song, if he only played a run Harrison had already devised, or if Page only backed up Harrison himself". Morrison has acknowledged Page's participation in the early sessions: "He played rhythm guitar on one thing and doubled a bass riff on the other" and Morrison biographer Johnny Rogan notes that Page "doubled the distinctive riff already worked out by Billy Harrison".

Janovitz identifies the riff as "the backbone of the arrangement" and describes Henderson's contribution as an "amphetamine-rush, pulsing two-note bass line."   Music critic Greil Marcus comments that during the song's quieter middle passage "the guitarist, session player Jimmy Page or not, seems to be feeling his way into another song, flipping half-riffs, high, random, distracted metal shavings". Them's blues rock arrangement is "now regarded justly as definitive", according to music writer Alan Clayson.

Releases and charts
Decca released "Baby, Please Don't Go" as Them's second single on November 6, 1964. With the B-side, "Gloria", it became their first hit, reaching number ten on the UK Singles Chart in February 1965. In the US, the single was released by Parrot Records. On March 20, Billboard magazine first listed the song on its extended "Bubbling Under the Hot 100" chart, where it eventually peaked at number 102 on April 24. The single fared better on the West Coast, where both songs appeared on weekly Top 40 playlists for Los Angeles radio station KRLA between March and June 1965, reaching number one for three weeks in April. Cash Box described it as "a funky, hard-driving pleader that the fellas rock out with telling effect".

The song was not included on Them's original British or American albums (The Angry Young Them and Them Again), however, it has appeared on several compilation albums, such as The Story of Them Featuring Van Morrison and The Best of Van Morrison.  When it was reissued in 1991 as a single in the UK, it reached number 65 in the chart. Van Morrison also accompanied John Lee Hooker during a 1992 performance, where Hooker sings and plays "Baby, Please Don't Go" on guitar while sitting on a dock, with harmonica backing by Morrison; it was released on the 2004 Come See About Me Hooker DVD.

AC/DC version

"Baby, Please Don't Go" was a feature of AC/DC's live shows since their beginning. Although they have expressed their interest and inspiration in early blues songs, music writer Mick Wall identifies Them's adaptation of the song as the likely source. In November 1974, Angus Young, Malcolm Young, and Bon Scott recorded it for their 1975 Australian debut album, High Voltage. Tony Currenti is sometimes identified as the drummer for the song, although he suggests that it had been already recorded by Peter Clack. Wall notes that producer George Young played bass for most of the album, although Rob Bailey claims that many of the album's tracks were recorded with him.

High Voltage and a single with "Baby, Please Don't Go" were released simultaneously in Australia in February 1975. AllMusic critic Eduardo Rivadavia called the song "positively explosive". Albert Productions issued it as the single's B-side. However, the A-side "Love Song (Oh Jene)" was largely ignored and "Baby, Please Don't Go" began receiving airplay. The single entered the chart at the end of March 1975 and peaked at number 10 in April.

On March 23, 1975, one month after drummer Phil Rudd and bassist Mark Evans joined AC/DC, the group performed the song for the first time (this performance would also be repeated on April 6 and 27, which is why there is often conflicting dates for this performance) on the Australian music program Countdown. For their appearance, "Angus wore his trade mark schoolboy uniform while Scott took the stage wearing a wig of blonde braids, a dress, make-up, and earrings", according to author Heather Miller. Joe Bonomo describes Scott as "a demented Pippi Longstocking", and Perkins notes his "tattoos and a disturbingly short skirt." Evans describes the reaction:

Scott mugs for the camera and, during the guitar solo/vocal improvization section, he lights a cigarette as he duels with Angus with a green mallet. Rudd laughs throughout the performance. Although "Baby, Please Don't Go" was a popular part of AC/DC's performances (often as the closing number), the song was not released internationally until their 1984 compilation EP '74 Jailbreak. The video from the Countdown show is included on 2005's Family Jewels DVD compilation.

Aerosmith version
Aerosmith recorded "Baby, Please Don't Go" for their blues cover album, Honkin' on Bobo, which was released on March 30, 2004. The album was produced by Jack Douglas, who had worked on the group's earlier albums, and reflects a return to their hard rock roots. Billboard magazine describes the song as "the kind of straight-ahead, hard-driving track that always typified the band's [1970s] records". Edna Gundersen of USA Today called their version a "terrific revival." It was the first single to be released from the album and reached number seven on the Mainstream Rock Tracks chart. A music video, directed by Mark Haefeli, was produced to promote the single. Subsequently, the song has become a staple of the band's concert repertoire.

Recognition and legacy
"Baby, Please Don't Go" is recognized as a blues standard, including by French blues historian , who described it as "one of the most played, arranged, and rearranged pieces in blues history". The Rock and Roll Hall of Fame included Big Joe Williams' rendition in list of "500 Songs That Shaped Rock and Roll".  In 1992, Williams' song was inducted into the Blues Foundation Hall of Fame in the "Classics of Blues Recordings" category. Writing for the Foundation, Jim O'Neal noted that, in addition to various blues recordings, "the song was revived in revved-up fashion by rock bands in the '60s such as Them, the Amboy Dukes, and Ten Years After". 

In 1967, the Amboy Dukes recorded the song for their self-titled debut album. An album review mentions Them's version, but adds that the Amboy Dukes' "Ted Nugent and the boys totally twist it to their point-of-view, even tossing a complete Jimi Hendrix [guitar line from "Third Stone from the Sun"] nick into the mix." Released as a single, it reached number 106 on Billboards extended "Bubbling Under the Hot 100" chart. In 1969, Ten Years After included some lyrics from "Baby, Please Don't Go" during their performance of "I'm Going Home" at the Woodstock festival in Bethel, New York.  Alvin Lee's 10-minute guitar workout was a highlight of the event's 1970 documentary film, which "would cement their reputation for decades to come".

Notes
Footnotes

Citations

References

 

Year of song unknown
Blues songs
1949 singles
John Lee Hooker songs
1953 singles
Muddy Waters songs
1964 singles
Them (band) songs
2004 singles
AC/DC songs
Aerosmith songs
Deram Records singles
Decca Records singles
Parrot Records singles
Songwriter unknown
Bluebird Records singles